The FAO Food Price Index (FFPI) is a food price index by the Food and Agriculture Organization (FAO) of the United Nations. It records the development of world market prices of 55 agricultural commodities and foodstuffs. The FFPI is considered an indicator of future inflation and cost trends in the food industry.

Concept 
The trade-weighted FAO Food Price Index is technically a price index and is calculated using the Laspeyres formula. It documents the development of world market prices of 55 agricultural commodities and foodstuffs in U.S. dollars. Foodstuffs have been grouped by the Food and Agriculture Organization (FAO) of the United Nations into five commodity groups (meat, dairy products, cereals, oils and fats, and sugar).

When calculating the price index according to Étienne Laspeyres, the weights chosen (i.e., the quantities consumed) come from the base year. The reference period from 2014 to 2016 (index value 100) serves as the basis. The index determines the price of the commodity groups in the composition of the base year at goods prices of the reference year in relation to the price of the same commodity groups (same consumption quantities) at goods prices of the base year. From all the data, FAO calculates five sub-indices, which together make up the overall index.

The FAO Food Price Index is published on the first Thursday of every month.

Composition 

The overall index consists of the following five sub-indices:

 Meat Price Index (price index for meat)
 Dairy Price Index (price index for dairy products)
 Cereals Price Index (price index for cereals)
 Oils Price Index (price index for oils and fats)
 Sugar Price Index (price index for sugar)

Historical development 

The table shows the development of the FAO Food Price Index since 1990.

See also 

 Food prices
 Price index

References 

Commodity price indices